Austruca perplexa is a species of fiddler crab. It is found from the Ryukyu Islands, Japan to India, throughout the Malay Archipelago, along eastern Australian coasts from Queensland to New South Wales, and in various Pacific islands, including Fiji, Tonga and Vanuatu.

Austruca perplexa was formerly in the genus Uca, but in 2016 it was placed in the genus Austruca, a former subgenus of Uca.

As in other fiddler crabs, the male has a greatly enlarged claw, which is used for signalling. The higher the claw is waved by the male, the greater his chance of attracting a female; the size of the claw is therefore subject to sexual selection.

Austruca perplexa is usually found on sandy substrates near river mouths or on sheltered beaches in the mid-intertidal zone, usually near mangroves.

References 

Ocypodoidea
Crustaceans described in 1837
Taxa named by Henri Milne-Edwards